Mishra Dhatu Nigam Limited (abbreviated as MIDHANI), is a specialized metals and metal alloys manufacturing facility in India, located in Hyderabad, Telangana. It is a Public Sector Undertaking (PSU), under the administrative control of Department of Defence Production, Ministry of Defence, Government of India.
MIDHANI is the only producer of Titanium in India.

Products 
MIDHANI specializes in manufacturing a wide range of superalloys, titanium, special purpose steels and other special metals & alloys meeting stringent international standards for application in aerospace, defence, atomic energy, power generation, chemical and various other high technology industries.

Armour Products 

MIDHANI has been manufacturing bulk quantities of armour steel products offering ballistic protection against a variety of weapon systems including 9mm SMC, AK-47 and 7.62mm SLR etc. based on technologies developed by DMRL, a constituent of the DRDO.

Select few armoured products manufactured by MIDHANI are, "Rakshak" Bullet-proof jackets, "Patka" (Head band) for protection of head, Bullet proof protection of personnel carriers for paramilitary forces & VVIP cars and custom-made/fabricated armour systems.

MIDHANI also manufactures and markets Bhabha Kavach which is an armour panel which provides protection against bullets of different threat levels. A special process developed by BARC is used to create panels offering Level III and Level III+ ballistic protection while being much lighter than other currently available ballistic armour in the international market. BARC has transferred the technology of Bhabha Kavach to MIDHANI and the Ordnance Factory Board, for serial production.

Welding Electrodes 

MIDHANI is the only company in India capable of manufacturing non-synthetic type welding electrodes for various defence applications namely, for the construction of nuclear submarines, surface ships, among others.

Biomedical Implants 

MIDHANI manufactures custom implants/ biomedical products to suit the specific requirements of patients and doctors, for e.g., Hinge Knee Joint, Ace tabular cup with attached Iliac Wing and Lumbar Puncture Needle Device etc.

MIDHANI conforms to ASTM, BS, ISO & IS & other standards for materials as well as biomedical products. MIDHANI has facilities for inspection and quality control for surgical implants like – full range of Mechanical Testing, comprehensive Physical and Magnetic testing, total range of NDT including gamma ray, ultrasonic, magnetic, dye penetrate test etc.

Nickel–Titanium Shape Memory Alloys (NiTi-SMAs) 

Under the Make in India initiative, MIDHANI has signed a Transfer of Technology (ToT) Agreement with National Aerospace Laboratories (CSIR-NAL), a Bangalore-based premier R&D Laboratory, for the processing of Nickel –Titanium Shape Memory Alloys (NiTi-SMAs) for Engineering and Bio-medical Applications. The Shape Memory Technology is a result of decade of R&D work carried out at CSIR-NAL. MIDHANI has already ventured into development and manufacturing of Titanium Implants using the spin off technologies for defence applications, and is now tapping into the huge emerging potential of Nickel – Titanium (NiTi) shape memory alloys in Bio-Medical Sector (medical devices), especially the stent market for which the company will manufacture shape memory alloys and market the products for the first time in India.

The total market for NiTi SMA Products in India is estimated to be Rs. 1500 – Rs. 2500 crore which is 3 – 5% of the global consumption. MIDHANI plans to manufacture NiTi Shape Memory Alloys in wires, strips, rods, springs and plates form. Presently NiTi shape memory alloys are not available commercially in the country, and the total requirements are met by import.

By signing this Transfer of Shape Memory Alloy processing Technology and the technological support that would be available from CSIR-NAL during the start-of-art vacuum melting and alloy processing, MIDHANI will enter into the realm of commercial production of ‘smart’ material and will join the band of select few shape memory alloy manufacturers in the world.

Services

Consultancy

Customized Products/Services 
Forging, rolling, heat treatment, investment & sand castings and other conversion jobs are carried out by MIDHANI for its customers. Manufacture of finished machined and fabricated products is also undertaken by the Company which makes use of in-house and external facilities to carry out assignments by taking single-point responsibility for the end products.

Metallurgical Consultancy Services 
MIDHANI has acquired an in-depth understanding of the Processing – Structure Evolution – Material Performance / Behavior interrelationships which have contributed to solving several daunting technological problems in the field of metallurgy. The company offers failure analysis, material selection and alloy design services on a consultancy basis to customers.

Testing & Evaluation 
A comprehensive range of testing and evaluation services covering chemical analysis, mechanical, non-destructive and magnetic testing are rendered by Midhani.

Facilities 
MIDHANI's primary manufacturing facilities are located in the City of Hyderabad, State of Telangana.

The manufacturing facility also includes facilities such as – vacuum arc re-melting furnaces, vacuum induction melting furnaces, creep testing machines, heat treatment and oil quenching facilities, electro-slag refining furnaces, vacuum induction refining furnaces, primary melting furnaces and secondary melting furnaces

It has specialised facilities which includes – Precision 12-HI-Cold-Strip mill, 1500 Ton forge press, hot rolling & precision cold rolling mills, bar and wire drawing machines, tube plant, Vacuum Investment Casting Facility, core & lamination facility, quality assurance & control lab  as well as facilities for various other related applications.

MIDHANI is also the only company to possess a 6000 Ton forging press in India.

MIDHANI has also set up a 4 MW solar power plant, spread over 20 acres of land, and generates 7,000 MWh/year of electricity with a projected saving of Rs 5 crore per year and reduction of 5,600 tonnes of carbon dioxide per year. It will cover up to 15 percent of the power requirements of the company from renewable sources.

Current projects

Wide Plate Mill 
MIDHANI, Hyderabad, awarded a contract to Danieli for the design, manufacture, supply and installation of a complete, modern plate mill complex consisting of wide plate rolling mill and a modern plate treatment and finishing.

The new wide plate mill will be able to process metal plates up to 3100 mm wide and from 4 mm to 20 mm in thickness in a large range of special alloys, including titanium, super-alloys, stainless steel, HSLA steels, etc.

Production for the first plates is scheduled to begin by the second half of 2019.

Aluminium Alloy plant 
MIDHANI is planning to set up an aluminium alloy plant at Bodduvaripalem, 21 km from Nellore City, in Kodavalur mandal of SPSR Nellore district.

The organisation is planning to invest between Rs. 2,500 crore to Rs. 3,000 crore on the facility.

The Midhani plant will be a joint venture with the state-owned aluminium producing company, National Aluminium Company (Nalco).
 A foreign country will join in as a technology partner and consultant.

Armouring unit 
MIDHANI will set another unit at the Industrial Model Township (IMT), Rohtak, Haryana, where the company has decided to set up its unit to manufacture 13 types of armoured vehicles. Land has been acquired for the Rohtak plant, which will manufacture bullet-proof jackets, bullet-proof vehicles and similar products for the armed forces.

References 

Government-owned companies of India
Metal companies of India
Manufacturing companies established in 1973
1973 establishments in Andhra Pradesh
Indian companies established in 1973
Companies listed on the National Stock Exchange of India
Companies listed on the Bombay Stock Exchange